Joseph Abura  is an Anglican bishop in Uganda: he has been  Bishop of Karamoja since 2006.

References

Anglican bishops of Karamoja
21st-century Anglican bishops in Uganda
Living people
Uganda Christian University alumni
Year of birth missing (living people)